Frederik Hansen may refer to:
 Frederik Hansen (gymnast) (1896–1962), Danish gymnast at the 1920 Summer Olympics
 Frederik Hansen (wrestler) (1885–1981), Danish wrestler at the 1912 Summer Olympics

See also
 Frede Hansen (1897–1979), Danish gymnast at the 1920 Summer Olympics